The University of Warsaw is a public university in Warsaw, Poland. Established in 1816, it is the largest institution of higher learning in the country offering 37 different fields of study as well as 100 specializations in humanities, technical, and the natural sciences.

The University of Warsaw consists of 126 buildings and educational complexes with over 18 faculties: biology, chemistry, journalism and political science, philosophy and sociology, physics, geography and regional studies, geology, history, applied linguistics and philology, Polish language, pedagogy, economics, law and public administration, psychology, applied social sciences, management and mathematics, computer science and mechanics.

The University of Warsaw is one of the top Polish universities. It was ranked by Perspektywy magazine as the best Polish university in 2010, 2011, 2014, 2016, 2019, and 2022. ARWU ranked the university as the best Polish higher level institution in 2012, 2017, 2018, and 2020. The university is especially well-regarded in science. ARWU ranked the mathematics and physics branches of the institution in the global top 150 and top 75, respectively, in 2022.

History

Beginnings under Alexander I (1816–1918) 

In 1795, the partitions of Poland left Warsaw with access only to the Academy of Vilnius when the oldest and most influential Polish academic center, the Jagiellonian University in Kraków, became part of the Austrian Habsburg monarchy. In 1815, the newly established semi-autonomous polity of Congress Poland found itself without a university at all, as Vilnius was incorporated into the Russian Empire. In 1816, Alexander I permitted the Polish authorities to create a university, comprising five departments: Law and Administration, Medicine, Philosophy, Theology, and Art and Humanities. The university soon grew to 800 students and 50 professors. After most of the students and professors took part in the November 1830 Uprising the university was closed down; it was again closed after the failed January Uprising of 1863. As a consequence, all Polish-language schools were prohibited by the Imperial Russian government which controlled Congress Poland. During its short existence, the university educated thousands of students, many of whom became part of the backbone of the Polish intelligentsia.

In 1915, during the First World War, Warsaw was seized by German Empire and the occupying German authorities allowed a certain degree of liberalization to gain military support from the Poles. In accordance with the concept of Mitteleuropa, the Germans permitted several Polish social and educational societies to be recreated, including the University of Warsaw. The Polish language was reintroduced, but, in order to maintain Polish patriotic movement in control, the number of lecturers was kept low. No limits on the number of students; between 1915 and 1918 the number of alumni rose from a mere 1,000 to over 4,500.

Second Polish Republic (1918–1939) 

After Poland regained its independence in 1918, the University of Warsaw began to grow very quickly. It was reformed; all the important posts (the rector, senate, deans and councils) became democratically elected, and the state spent considerable amounts of money to modernize and equip it. Many professors returned from exile and cooperated in the effort. By the late 1920s the level of education in Warsaw had reached that of western Europe.

By the beginning of the 1930s the University of Warsaw had become the largest university in Poland, with over 250 lecturers and 10,000 students. However, the financial problems of the newly reborn state did not allow for free education, and students had to pay a tuition fee for their studies (an average monthly salary, for a year). Also, the number of scholarships was very limited, and only approximately 3% of students were able to get one. Despite these economic problems, the University of Warsaw grew rapidly. New departments were opened, and the main campus was expanded. After the death of Józef Piłsudski the Senate of the University of Warsaw changed its name to "Józef Piłsudski University of Warsaw" (Uniwersytet Warszawski im. Józefa Piłsudskiego). The Sanacja government proceeded to limit the autonomy of the universities. Professors and students remained divided for the rest of the 1930s as the system of segregated seating for Jewish students, known as ghetto benches, was introduced.

World War II (1939–1945) 

After the Polish Defensive War of 1939 the German authorities of the General Government closed all the institutions of higher education in Poland. The equipment and most of the laboratories were taken to Germany and divided amongst the German universities while the main campus of the University of Warsaw was turned into military barracks.

German racial theories assumed that no education of Poles was needed and the whole nation was to be turned into uneducated serfs of the German race. Education in Polish was banned and punished with death. However, many professors organized the so-called "Secret University of Warsaw" (Tajny Uniwersytet Warszawski). The lectures were held in small groups in private apartments and the attendants were constantly risking discovery and death. However, the net of underground faculties spread rapidly and by 1944 there were more than 300 lecturers and 3,500 students at various courses.

Many students took part in the Warsaw Uprising as soldiers of the Armia Krajowa and Szare Szeregi. The German-held campus of the university was turned into a fortified area with bunkers and machine gun nests. It was located close to the buildings occupied by the German garrison of Warsaw. Heavy fights for the campus started on the first day of the Uprising, but the partisans were not able to break through the gates. Several assaults were bloodily repelled and the campus remained in German hands until the end of the fights. During the uprising and the occupation 63 professors were killed, either during fights or as an effect of German policy of extermination of Polish intelligentsia. The university lost 60% of its buildings during the fighting in 1944. A large part of the collection of priceless works of art and books donated to the university was either destroyed or transported to Germany, never to return.

Post-war and the People's Republic (1945–1989) 

After World War II it was not clear whether the university would be restored or whether Warsaw itself would be rebuilt. However, many professors who had survived the war returned, and began organizing the university from scratch. In December 1945, lectures resumed for almost 4,000 students in the ruins of the campus, and the buildings were gradually rebuilt. Until the late 1940s the university remained relatively independent. However, soon the communist authorities started to impose political controls, and the period of Stalinism started. Many professors were arrested by the Urząd Bezpieczeństwa (Secret Police), the books were censored and ideological criteria in employment of new lecturers and admission of students were introduced. On the other hand, education in Poland became free of charge and the number of young people to receive the state scholarships reached 60% of all the students. After Władysław Gomułka's rise to power in 1956, a brief period of liberalization ensued, though communist ideology still played a major role in most faculties (especially in such faculties as history, law, economics, and political science). International cooperation was resumed and the level of education rose.

By mid-1960s the government started to suppress freedom of thought, which led to increasing unrest among the students. A political struggle within the communist party prompted Zenon Kliszko to ban the production of Dziady by Mickiewicz at the Teatr Narodowy, leading to 1968 Polish political crisis coupled with anti-Zionist and anti-democratic campaign and the outbreak of student demonstrations in Warsaw, which were brutally crushed – not by police, but by the ORMO reserve militia squads of plain-clothed workers. As a result, a large number of students and professors were expelled from the university. Nonetheless, the university remained the centre of free thought and education. What professors could not say during lectures, they expressed during informal meetings with their students. Many of them became leaders and prominent members of the Solidarity movement and other societies of the democratic opposition which led to the collapse of communism. The scientists working at the University of Warsaw were also among the most prominent printers of books forbidden by censorship.

Third Polish Republic (1989–present)
In 1999, a new University of Warsaw Library building was opened in Powiśle.  After Poland joined the European Union in 2004, the university obtained additional funds from the European Structural and Investment Funds for the construction of additional buildings including the Biological and Chemical Research Centre, Centre of New Technologies, and a new building for the Faculty of Physics.

Campus 

University of Warsaw owns a total of 126 buildings. Further construction and a vigorous renovation program are underway at the main campus. The university is spread out over the city, though most of the buildings are concentrated in two areas.

Main campus

The main campus of the University of Warsaw is in the city center, adjacent to the Krakowskie Przedmieście street. It comprises several historic palaces, most of which had been nationalized in the 19th century. The chief buildings include:
 Kazimierzowski Palace (Pałac Kazimierzowski) – the seat of the rector and the Senate;
 Uruski Palace (Pałac Uruskich) – left side of main gate entrance, houses the Department of Geography and Regional Studies
 the Old Library (Stary BUW) – since recent refurbishment, a secondary lecture building;
 the Main School (Szkoła Główna) – former seat of the Main School until the January 1863 Uprising, later the faculty of biology; now, since its refurbishment, the seat of the Institute of archaeology;
 Auditorium Maximum – the main lecture hall, with seats for several hundred students.

The Warsaw University Library building is a short walk downhill from the main campus, in the Powiśle neighborhood.

Natural sciences campus

The second important campus is located near Banacha and Pasteura streets. It is home to the departments of chemistry, physics, biology, mathematics, computer science, and geology, and contains several other university buildings such as the Interdisciplinary Centre for Mathematical and Computational Modelling, the Environmental Heavy Ion Laboratory that houses a cyclotron and a facility for the production of PET radiopharmaceuticals, and a sports facility. Several new buildings have been constructed within this campus in recent years, and the Department of Physics moved here from its previous location at Hoża Street.

Faculties 

 
 Faculty of Applied Linguistics
 Faculty of Applied Social Sciences and Resocialization
 Faculty of Archaeology
 Faculty of “Artes Liberales”
 Faculty of Biology
 Faculty of Chemistry
 Faculty of Culture and Arts
 Faculty of Economic Sciences
 Faculty of Education
 Faculty of Geography and Regional Studies
 Faculty of Geology
 Faculty of History
 Faculty of Journalism, Information and Book Studies
 Faculty of Law and Administration
 Faculty of Management
 Faculty of Mathematics, Informatics and Mechanics
 Faculty of Modern Languages
 Faculty of Oriental Studies
 Faculty of Sociology
 Faculty of Philosophy
 Faculty of Physics
 Faculty of Polish Studies
 Faculty of Political Science and International Studies
 Faculty of Psychology

Other institutes 

 American Studies Center
 British Studies Centre
 Centre de Civilisation Française et d'Études Francophones auprès de l'Université de Varsovie
 Centre for Archaeological Research at Novae
 Centre for Environmental Study
 Centre for Europe
 Centre for European Regional and Local Studies (EUROREG)
 Centre for Foreign Language Teaching
 Centre for Inter-Faculty Individual Studies in the Humanities
 Centre for Latin-American Studies (CESLA)
 Centre for Open Multimedia Education
 Centre for the Study of Classical Tradition in Poland and East-Central Europe
 Centre of Studies in Territorial Self-Government and Local Development
 Chaire UNESCO du Developpement Durable de l`Universite de Vaersovie
 Comité Polonais de l'Alliance Français
 Digital Economy Lab (DELab) – joint institute with Google
 Erasmus of Rotterdam Chair
 Heavy Ion Laboratory
 Individual Inter-faculty Studies in Mathematics and Natural Sciences
 Institute of Americas and Europe
 Institute of International Relations – host of GMAPIR
 The Robert B.Zajonc Institute for Social Studies
 Inter-faculty Study Programme in Environmental Protection
 Interdisciplinary Centre for Behavioural Genetics
 Interdisciplinary Centre for Mathematical and Computational Modelling
 Physical Education and Sports Centre
 Polish Centre of Mediterranean Archaeology
 University Centre for Technology Transfer
 University College of English Language Teacher Education
 University of Warsaw for Foreign Language Teacher Training and European Education

Institutions 
 Academic Radio Kampus 97,1 FM
 Institute of Information Science and Book Studies
 The Institute of Polish Language and Culture 'Polonicum'
 University of Warsaw Libraries

The university in popular culture
 In Ian Fleming's 1961 novel Thunderball, the ninth book in the James Bond series, one of the main characters, Ernst Stavro Blofeld who is the  head of the global criminal organisation SPECTRE, is said to be a graduate of the University of Warsaw.
 In 2016, the Polish Post issued commemorative stamps on the 200th anniversary of the founding of the university depicting the Column Hall of the building of the Faculty of History.

Notable alumni 

 Jerzy Andrzejewski (1909–1983), author
 Szymon Askenazy (1865-1935), Polish jurist, historian, educator, first Polish representative to the League of Nations
 Krzysztof Kamil Baczyński (1921–1944), poet, Home Army soldier killed in the Warsaw Uprising
 Menachem Begin (1913–1992), 6th Prime Minister of Israel (1977–1983), Nobel Peace Prize winner (1978)
 Marek Bieńczyk (born 1956), writer, historian of literature, essayist and translator, Nike Award winner (2012)
 Adam Bodnar (born 1977), lawyer, human rights activist, Polish Ombudsman
 Tadeusz Borowski (1922–1951), poet, writer
 Kazimierz Brandys (1916–2000), writer
 Marian Brandys (1912–1998), writer, journalist
 Frédéric Chopin (1810–1849), pianist, composer
 Włodzimierz Cimoszewicz (born 1950), politician, Prime Minister of Poland (1996–1997), Marshal of the Sejm (2005)
 Tomasz Dietl (born 1950), physicist
 Samuel Eilenberg (1913–1998), mathematician, computer scientist, art collector
 Barbara Engelking (born 1962), sociologist
 Joseph Epstein (1911–1944), communist leader of French resistance
 Lech Gardocki (born 1944) lawyer, judge, former First President of the Supreme Court of Poland
 Marek Gazdzicki (born 1956), nuclear physicist
 Bronisław Geremek (1932–2008), historian, politician
 Małgorzata Gersdorf (born 1952), lawyer, first President of the Supreme Court of Poland
 Maciej Gliwicz (born 1939), biologist
 Witold Gombrowicz (1904–1969), writer
 Hanna Gronkiewicz-Waltz (born 1952), politician, President of the National Bank of Poland (1992–2001), Mayor of Warsaw (2006–2018)
 Jan T. Gross (born 1947), historian, writer, Princeton University professor
 Zofia Helman (born 1937), musicologist
 Gustaw Herling-Grudziński (1919–2000), journalist, writer, Gulag survivor
 Leonid Hurwicz (1917–2008), economist, mathematician, Nobel Prize in Economics (2007)
 Maria Janion (1926-2020), literary critic 
 Monika Jaruzelska (born 1963) fashion designer, journalist, daughter of former Polish President Wojciech Jaruzelski
 Jerzy Jedlicki (1930–2018), historian of ideas, anti-communist activist
 Jarosław Kaczyński (born 1949), politician, Prime Minister of Poland (2006–2007)
 Lech Kaczyński (1949–2010), politician, Mayor of Warsaw (2002–2005), President of Poland (2005–2010)
 Andrzej Kalwas (born 1936), lawyer, businessman, and former Polish Minister of Justice
 Aleksander Kamiński (1903–1978), writer, leader of Polish Scouting and Guiding Association
 Ryszard Kapuściński (1932–2007), writer and journalist
 Mieczysław Karłowicz (1876–1909), composer
 Jan Karski (1914–2000), Polish resistance fighter
 Zofia Kielan-Jaworowska (1925–2015), paleobiologist
 Leszek Kołakowski (1927–2009), philosopher, historian of philosophy
 Bronisław Komorowski (born 1952), politician, Marshal of the Sejm (2007–2010), President of Poland (2010–2015)
 Alpha Oumar Konaré, (born 1946), 3rd President of Mali (1992–2002)
 Wojciech Kopczuk, Columbia University economist
 Janusz Korwin-Mikke (born 1942), conservative-liberal politician and journalist
 Marek Kotański (1942–2002), psychologist and streetworker
 Jacek Kuroń (1934–2004), historian, author, social worker, and politician
 Jan Józef Lipski (1926–1991), literature historian, politician
 Ewa Łętowska (born 1940), lawyer, first Polish Ombudsman for Citizen Rights
 Jerzy Łojek (1932–1986), historian, writer
 Olga Malinkiewicz (born 1982), physicist
 Tadeusz Mazowiecki (1927–2013), author, social worker, journalist, Prime Minister of Poland (1989–1991)
 Adam Michnik (born 1946), journalist
 Karol Modzelewski (1937–2019), historian, politician
 Mirosław Nahacz (1984–2007), novelist, screenwriter
 Jerzy Neyman (1894–1981), mathematician, statistician, University of California professor
 Jan Olszewski (1930-2019), lawyer, politician, Prime Minister of Poland (1991–1992)
 Janusz Onyszkiewicz (born 1937), politician
 Maria Ossowska (1896–1974), sociologist
 Bohdan Paczyński (1940–2007), astronomer
 Rafał Pankowski (born 1976), sociologist and political scientist
 Longin Pastusiak (born 1935), politician, Marshal of the Senate of the Republic of Poland (2001–2005)
 Bolesław Piasecki (1915–1979), politician
 Krzysztof Piesiewicz (born 1945), lawyer, screenwriter
 Marian Pilot (born 1936), writer, journalist and screenwriter, Nike Award winner (2011)
 Moshe Prywes (1914–1998), Israeli physician and educator; first President of Ben-Gurion University of the Negev
 Adam Przeworski (born 1940), political scientist, New York University professor
 Bolesław Prus (1847–1912), writer
 Mikhail Reisner (1868-1928), Russian and Soviet jurist, historian and academic.
 Emanuel Ringelblum (1900–1944), historian, founder Emanuel Ringelblum Archives of Warsaw Ghetto
 Ireneusz Roszkowski (1910–1996), precursor of prenatal medicine
 Józef Rotblat (1908–2005), physicist, Nobel Peace Prize (1995)
 Stefan Sarnowski (1939-2014), philosopher
 Stanisław Sedlaczek (1892–1941), social worker, leader of Polish Scouting and Guiding Association
 Yitzhak Shamir (1915–2012), 7th Prime Minister of Israel (1983–1984 and 1986–1992)
 Wacław Sierpiński (1882–1969), mathematician
 Andrzej Sobolewski (born 1951), physicist
 Alexander Soloviev (1890-1971) Russian émigré jurist, historian, academic.
 Dmitry Strelnikoff (born 1969), Russian writer, biologist, journalist for the media
 Kazimiera Szczuka (born 1966), literary critic, feminist, LGBT rights activist, television personality
 Adam Szymczyk (born 1970), art critic and curator
 Magdalena Środa (born 1957), philosopher and feminist
 Alfred Tarski (1902–1982), logician, mathematician, member of the Lwów-Warsaw school of logic
 Władysław Tatarkiewicz (1886–1980), philosopher, historian of esthetics
 Olga Tokarczuk (born 1962), writer, essayist, psychologist, Nobel Prize in Literature (2018)
 Rafał Trzaskowski (born 1972), politician, academic teacher, Mayor of Warsaw
 Julian Tuwim (1894–1953), poet and writer
 Alfred Twardecki (born 1962), archaeologist, historian of antiquity, museologist
 Andrzej Udalski (born 1957), astronomer and astrophysicist
 Mordkhe Veynger (1890–1929), Soviet-Jewish linguist
 Kostiantyn Voblyi (1876-1947), Ukrainian economist, academic, active in the Russian Empire and Soviet Union.
 Andrzej Kajetan Wróblewski (born 1933), experimental physicist 
 Janusz Andrzej Zajdel (1938–1985), physicist and science-fiction writer
 Ludwik Zamenhof (1859–1917), physician, inventor of Esperanto
 Andrzej Zaniewski  (born 1939), author and poet
 Paweł Zarzeczny (1961–2017), sports journalist, columnist and TV personality
 Anna Zawadzka (1919–2004), social worker, leader of Polish Scouting and Guiding Association
 Maciej Zembaty (1944–2011), poet, writer, translator of Leonard Cohen's works
 Rafał A. Ziemkiewicz (born 1964), writer
 Florian Znaniecki (1882–1958), philosopher and sociologist

Notable staff

Professors 
 Osman Achmatowicz (1899–1988), chemist, rector of the Technical University of Łódź (1946–1953)
 Vladimir Prokhorovich Amalitskii (1860–1917), paleontologist
 Szymon Askenazy (1866–1935), historian
 Aleksandr Nikolaevich Bartenev (1882-1946), zoologist
 Maria Ludwika Bernhard (1908–1998), archaeologist
 Karol Borsuk (1905–1982), mathematician
 Franciszek Bujak (1919–1921) historian
 Jan Niecisław Baudouin de Courtenay (1845–1929), linguist, introduced the concept of a phoneme
 Zygmunt Bauman (1925–2017), sociologist
 Tomasz Dietl (born 1950), physisct, Laureate of Agilient Technologies Europhysics Prize of The European Physical Society (2005)
 Samuel Dickstein (1851-1939), mathematician, proponent of Jewish assimilation in Poland
 Benedykt Dybowski (1833–1930), biologist and explorer of Siberia and Baikal area
 Aleksandr Mikhailovich Evlakhov (1880-1966), literary critic
 Michel Foucault (1926–1984), French philosopher, at the university dean-faculty of the French Centre 1958–1959
 Stanisław Grabski (1871–1949), economist
 Dmitri Iosifovich Ivanovsky (1864-1920), botanist, pioneer in the discovery and study of viruses
 Henryk Jabłoński (1909–2003), historian, nominal head of state of Poland (1972–1985)
 Feliks Pawel Jarocki (1790–1865), zoologist
 Barbara Jaruzelska (1931–2017), philologist and German studies professor, First Lady of Poland (1985–1990)
 Nikolai Ivanovich Kareev (1850-1931), philosopher, historian
 Yefim Fyodorovich Karsky (1861-1931) linguist, etnographer, paleographer
 Jerzy Kolendo (1955-1983), classical archaeologist and historian
 Leszek Kołakowski (1927–2009), philosopher
 Kazimierz Kuratowski (1896–1980), mathematician
 Joachim Lelewel (1786–1861), historian, politician and freedom fighter
 Antoni Leśniowski (1867–1940), surgeon and medic, one of the discoverers of Crohn's disease
 Edward Lipiński (1888–1986), economist, founder of the Main Statistical Office
 Jan Łukasiewicz (1878–1956), mathematician and logician
 Mieczysław Maneli (1922–1994), jurist
 Leszek Marks (born 1951), geologist
 Kazimierz Michałowski (1901–1981), archaeologist, explorer of Deir el Bahari and Faras
 Andrzej Mostowski (1913–1975), mathematician
 Nikolai Viktorovich Nasonov (1855-1939), zoologist
 Maria Ossowska (1896–1974), sociologist
 Stanisław Ossowski (1897–1963), sociologist
 Vladimir Ivanovich Palladin (1859-1922), biochemist, botanist
 Grigol Peradze (1899–1942), Orthodox theologian
 Leon Petrażycki (1867–1931), jurist, philosopher and logician, one of the founders of sociology of law
 Ladislaus Pilars de Pilar (1874–1952), literature professor, poet and entrepreneur
 Adam Podgórecki (1925–1998), sociologist of law
 Dmitry Yakovlevich Samokvasov (1843-1911), archaeologist, legal historian
 Henryk Samsonowicz (1930–2021), historian, rector (1980–1982)
 Wacław Sierpiński (1882–1969), mathematician
 Alfred Sokołowski (1849–1924), physician and a pioneer in tuberculosis treatment
 Hélène Sparrow (1891–1970), bacteriologist and public health pioneer, especially typhus
 Nikolay Yakovlevich Sonin (1849–1915), mathematician
 Jan Strelau (born 1931), psychologist
 Jerzy Szacki (1929–2016), sociologist and historian
 Andrzej K. Tarkowski (born 1933), zoologist, Laureate of Japan Prize (2002)
 Stanisław Thugutt (1873–1941), politician, rector (1919–1920)
 Georgy Feodosevich Voronoy (1868-1908), mathematician
 Tadeusz Wałek-Czarnecki (1889–1949), professor of Ancient History 
 Ewa Wipszycka (born 1933), historian and papyrologist
 Władysław Witwicki (1878–1948), psychologist, philosopher, translator and artist
 Georgy Viktorovich Wulff (1863-1925), crystallographer
 Włodzimierz Zonn (1905–1985), astronomer

Rectors 

 Wojciech Szweykowski (1818–1831)
 Józef Karol Skrodzki (1831)
 Józef Mianowski (1862–1869)
 Piotr Ławrowski (1869–1873)
 Nikołaj Błagowieszczański (1874–1884)
 Nikołaj Ławrowski (1884–1890)
 Michaił Szałfiejew (1895)
 Pawieł Kowalewski (1896)
 Grigorij Zenger (1896)
 Michaił Szałfiejew (1898)
 Grigorij Uljanow (1899–1903)
 Piotr Ziłow (1904)
 Yefim Karskiy (1905–1911)
 Wasilij Kudrewiecki (1911–1912)
 Iwan Trepicyn (1913)
 Siergiej Wiechow (1914–1915)
 Józef Brudziński (1915–1917)
 Antoni Kostanecki (1917–1919)
 Stanisław Thugutt (1919–1920)
 Jan Karol Kochanowski (1920–1921)
 Jan Mazurkiewicz (1921–1922)
 Jan Łukasiewicz (1922–1923)
 Ignacy Koschembahr-Łyskowski (1923–1924)
 Franciszek Krzyształowicz (1924–1925)
 Stefan Pieńkowski (1925–1926)
 Bolesław Hryniewiecki (1926–1927)
 Antoni Szlagowski (1927–1928)
 Gustaw Przychocki (1928–1929)
 Tadeusz Brzeski (1929–1930)
 Mieczysław Michałowicz (1930–1931)
 Jan Łukasiewicz (1931–1932)
 Józef Ujejski (1932–1933)
 Stefan Pieńkowski (1933–1936)
 Włodzimierz Antoniewicz (1936–1939)
 Jerzy Modrakowski (1939)
 Stefan Pieńkowski (1945–1947)
 Franciszek Czubalski (1947–1949)
 Jan Wasilkowski (1949–1952)
 Stanisław Turski (1952–1969)
 Zygmunt Rybicki (1969–1980)
 Henryk Samsonowicz (1980–1982)
 Kazimierz Albin Dobrowolski (1982–1985)
 Rector electus Klemens Szaniawski (1984)
 Grzegorz Białkowski (1985–1989)
 Andrzej Kajetan Wróblewski (1989–1993)
 Włodzimierz Siwiński (1993–1999)
 Piotr Węgleński (1999–2005)
 Katarzyna Chałasińska-Macukow (2005–2012)
 Marcin Pałys (2012–2020)
 Alojzy Nowak (since 2020)

Staff

 Czesław Miłosz – janitor at Warsaw University Library during World War II; recipient of 1980 Nobel Prize in Literature.

See also 
 List of modern universities in Europe (1801–1945)
 Open access in Poland
 Warsaw School of History (Askenazy school)
 Warsaw School of Mathematics
 Main building of Warsaw University (Rostov-on-Don)

Notes

External links 

 
 The WU Students Association
 Website of The University New Library

 
Educational institutions established in 1816
1816 establishments in the Russian Empire
1810s establishments in Poland